Capanaparo River is a river of Colombia and Venezuela. It is part of the Orinoco River basin. In Venezuela together with the Cinaruco River, other smaller rivers and the area around them they form the Santos Luzardo National Park since 1988.

See also
 List of rivers of Colombia
 List of rivers of Venezuela

References
Rand McNally, The New International Atlas, 1993.

Rivers of Colombia
Rivers of Venezuela
International rivers of South America